The Zengid dynasty was a Muslim dynasty of Oghuz Turkic origin, which ruled parts of the Levant and Upper Mesopotamia on behalf of the Seljuk Empire and eventually seized control of Egypt in 1169. In 1174 the Zengid state extended from Tripoli to Hamadan and from Yemen to Sivas. The dynasty was founded by Imad ad-Din Zengi.

History
Zengi, son of Aq Sunqur al-Hajib, became the Seljuk atabeg of Mosul in 1127. He quickly became the chief Turkic potentate in Northern Syria and Iraq, taking Aleppo from the squabbling Artuqids in 1128 and capturing the County of Edessa from the Crusaders after the siege of Edessa in 1144. This latter feat made Zengi a hero in the Muslim world, but he was assassinated by a slave two years later, in 1146.

On Zengi's death, his territories were divided, with Mosul and his lands in Iraq going to his eldest son Saif ad-Din Ghazi I, and Aleppo and Edessa falling to his second son, Nur ad-Din, atabeg of Aleppo. Nur ad-Din proved to be as competent as his father. In 1149, he defeated Raymond of Poitiers, Prince of Antioch, at the battle of Inab, and the next year conquered the remnants of the County of Edessa west of the Euphrates. In 1154, he capped off these successes by his capture of Damascus from the Burid dynasty that ruled it.

Now ruling from Damascus, Nur ad-Din's success continued. Another Prince of Antioch, Raynald of Châtillon was captured, and the territories of the Principality of Antioch were greatly reduced. In the 1160s, Nur ad-Din's attention was mostly held by a competition with the King of Jerusalem, Amalric of Jerusalem, for control of the Fatimid Caliphate. From 1163 to 1169 Shirkuh took part in a series of campaigns against Fatimid Egypt, in 1169 he lured the vizier into an ambush and killed him after which he seized Egypt in the name of his master Nur ad-Din therefore bringing Egypt under formal Zengid dominion.

Shirkuh's nephew Saladin was appointed vizier by the Fatimid caliph al-Adid and Governor of Egypt, in 1169. Al-Adid died in 1171, and Saladin took advantage of this power vacuum, effectively taking control of the country. Upon seizing power, he switched Egypt's allegiance to the Baghdad-based Abbasid Caliphate which adhered to Sunni Islam, rather than traditional Fatimid Shia practice. Tripoli, Yemen and the Hejaz were added to the state of Nur ad-Din. Nur ad-Din had taken Anatolian lands up to Sivas, his state extended from Tripoli to Hamadan and from Yemen to Sivas.

Nur ad-Din was preparing to invade Jerusalem when he unexpectedly died in 1174. His son and successor As-Salih Ismail al-Malik was only a child, and was forced to flee to Aleppo, which he ruled until 1181, when he died of illness and was replaced by his cousin Imad al-Din Zengi II. Saladin conquered Aleppo two years later, ending Zengid rule in Syria.

Zengid princes continued to rule in Northern Iraq as Emirs of Mosul well into the 13th century, ruling Mosul and Sinjar until 1234; their rule did not finally come to an end until 1250.

Zengid rulers

Zengid Atabegs and Emirs of Mosul

 Zengi, 1127–1146
 Sayf al-Din Ghazi I, son of Zengi, 1146–1149
 Qutb al-Din Mawdud, son of Zengi, 1149–1170
 Sayf al-Din Ghazi II, son of Qutb al-Din Mawdud, 1170–1180
 Izz al-Din Mas'ud, son of Qutb al-Din Mawdud, 1180–1193
 Nur al-Din Arslan Shah I, son of Izz al-Din Mas'ud, 1193–1211
 Izz al-Din Mas'ud II, son of Nur al-Din Arslan Shah I, 1211–1218
 Nur al-Din Arslan Shah II, son of Izz al-Din Mas'ud II, 1218–1219
 Nasir ad-Din Mahmud, son of Izz al-Din Mas'ud, 1219–1234.

Mosul was taken over by Badr al-Din Lu'lu', atabeg to Nasir ad-Din Mahmud, whom he murdered in 1234.

Zengid Emirs of Aleppo

Zengi, 1128–1146
Nur al-Din, son of Zengi, 1146–1174
As-Salih Ismail al-Malik, son of Nur al-Din, 1174–1182
Imad al-Din Zengi II,1182

Aleppo was conquered by Saladin in 1183 and ruled by Ayyubids until 1260.

Zengid Emirs of Damascus

Nur al-Din, son of Zengi, 1154–1174
As-Salih Ismail al-Malik, son of Nur al-Din, 1174.

Damascus was conquered by Saladin in 1174 and ruled by Ayyubids until 1260.

Zengid Emirs of Sinjar

Imad al-Din Zengi II, son of Qutb al-Din Mawdud, 1171–1197
Qutb ad-Din Muhammad, son of Zengi II, 1197–1219
Imad al-Din Shahanshah, son of Qutb ad-Din Muhammad, 1219–1220
 Jalal al-Din Mahmud (co-ruler), son of Qutb ad-Din Muhammad, 1219–1220
Fath al-Din Umar (co-ruler), son of Qutb ad-Din Muhammad, 1219–1220.

Sinjar was taken by the Ayyubids in 1220 and ruled by al-Ashraf Musa, Ayyubid emir of Diyar Bakr.  It later came under the control of Badr al-Din Lu'lu', ruler of Mosul beginning in 1234.

Zengid Emirs of al-Jazira (in Northern Iraq)

Mu'izz al-Din Sanjar Shah, son of Sayf al-Din Ghazi II, 1180–1208
Mu'izz al-Din Mahmud, son of Mu'izz al-Din Sanjar Shah, 1208–1241
Mahmud al-Malik al-Zahir, son of Mu'izz al-Din Mahmud, 1241–1250.

In 1250, al-Jazira fell under the domination of an-Nasir Yusuf, Ayyubid emir of Aleppo.

See also
List of Emirs of Mosul
List of Sunni Muslim dynasties

References

Sources

Taef El-Azharii (2006).  Zengi and the Muslim Response to the Crusades, Routledge, Abington, UK.

 
Medieval Syria
Medieval Jordan
Seljuk Empire
Atabegs
Muslims of the Second Crusade
Former vassal states
States and territories established in 1127
States and territories disestablished in 1250
Syrian people of Turkish descent
Iraqi people of Turkish descent
12th-century establishments in the Seljuk Empire
12th-century establishments in Asia
1250 disestablishments in Asia
Turkic dynasties